Jake Sweeting (born 15 December 1999) is a professional rugby league footballer who plays as a  or  for the Hunslet RLFC in the Betfred League 1.

He previously played for the Castleford Tigers in the Betfred Super League, and spent time on loan from the Tigers at Featherstone Rovers, Hunslet, York City Knights and Doncaster. Sweeting has also featured on loan from Dewsbury at Hunslet in Betfred League 1. 

In 2021 he made his Super League début for Castleford against the Huddersfield Giants.

References

External links
Hunslet profile

1999 births
Living people
Castleford Tigers players
Dewsbury Rams players
Doncaster R.L.F.C. players
English rugby league players
Featherstone Rovers players
Hunslet R.L.F.C. players
Rugby league halfbacks
York City Knights players